Deewane Huye Paagal (Lovers Gone Mad) is a 2005 romantic action comedy film directed by Vikram Bhatt, and produced by Firoz A. Nadiadwala. It is a stand-alone sequel to 2002 film Awara Paagal Deewana. The film features Akshay Kumar, Shahid Kapoor, Rimi Sen, Suniel Shetty, Paresh Rawal and Johnny Lever. Aftab Shivdasani and Vivek Oberoi make guest appearances. The film was released on 25 November 2005. It performed average at the box office, but is now considered a cult classic. The performance of the cast is widely appreciated in India.

It is an unofficial remake of the 1998 American comedy film: There's Something About Mary with some changes. This film was unofficially remade in Kannada as Chamkaisi Chindi Udaysi (2009).

Plot

Karan is in love with Tanya but is too shy to tell her. After he musters some courage and rescues her step-brother from some goons, he catches her attention and is eventually able to invite her to a fake birthday party. On her way there, Tanya witnesses the murder of a scientist, Khurana by his evil twin brother, the underworld don Mehboob, and as a result is forced to flee the country to save her own life. The scientist had stored a secret code in a stuffed toy, a parrot, now being sought by Mehboob, and Khurana was able to hide the toy in Tanya's car before being killed. Unaware, Tanya leaves the toy at home before fleeing the country, and the toy is later picked up by Karan, ignorant of Tanya's fate.

Three years later, still in love with Tanya, Karan learns that Tanya is in Dubai. He enlists the aid of a local hustler and bounty hunter, Rocky.

Rocky travels to Dubai, where his friend Babloo has already tracked down Tanya, who has become Natasha, a successful singer and performer. Rocky and Babloo stakeout Natasha's villa to make sure they are on the right track, but as soon as Rocky spots Natasha, it's love at first sight. While he has Natasha under surveillance, Karan and Murugan arrive at the Dubai airport from India. Faced with a potential competitor to woo Natasha, Rocky attempts to eliminate Karan from the picture by lying to him about Tanya. Karan is heartbroken and decides to go back to Mumbai. He is about to board his flight, when at the last moment, he spots a picture of Tanya as Natasha on a club advertisement. He is overjoyed, and assumes that Rocky made a mistake.

Though, there were two other people who were having feelings for Natasha.Local plumber, Sanju Malvani has been currying favours for Natasha by pretending to be a paraplegic on crutches. Every time Natasha meets someone she likes, Sanju eliminates the competitor using a unique trick. He edits and prints out a fake newspaper featuring an article showing that person as a crook, and comes over to Natasha and shares "the news" with her while acting all shocked himself.Also there is Tanya's physically disabled live-in friend Tommy, who also has a soft spot for her. Having heard of the death of Tanya's disabled brother, Tommy has since faked being run over in a car accident and now acts like he himself is disabled and mentally challenged.

Nonetheless, Rocky begins his attempted seduction of Natasha while pretending to be an architect. Natasha is ambushed in the parking lot by some thugs (who were hired by Rocky). Rocky intervenes, and after beating them, introduces himself to Natasha, and proceeds to show himself off as a charming professional with a heart of gold. Surprised, Natasha offers Rocky an invitation for tea later in the evening, which he accepts.

Later Rocky is confronted by several obstacles, Natasha's aunt Sweety, the jealous Tommy, and the family's pet dog. The parties departs to Natasha's latest album at a social event, where Rocky now comes face to face with Sanju, who is also pretending to be an architect.

With Natasha and company under surveillance, Rocky now intercepts Sanju trying to discredit him at Natasha's home. Later, when the shocked Natasha confronts Rocky about him being an alleged impostor, Rocky is able to convince Natasha that he is actually a captain on a ship. Tommy, however behaves in a somewhat jealous manner. He accuses Rocky of biting him. A food bill from a bar drops out of Tommy's pocket during his supposed accusation. This arouses Rocky's suspicions about his supposed "condition".

Rocky and Babloo track down Tommy at a local disco. Rocky confronts Tommy while he is on the disco floor and threatens to expose him in front of Natasha. At the end, Rocky lets Tommy go, on the condition that the latter will no longer attempt to get in his way of seducing Natasha.

Rocky has invited Natasha over for a cruise. Natasha spots Karan and Murugan sitting at the grounds. She introduces Karan to Rocky. Karan on seeing Rocky and Natasha happy wants to leave them alone out of his love for Tanya. While he tries to leave, Natasha convinces Karan to stay one more night in Dubai, and come over for dinner later in the day.

Sanju shows up later at the party, and pulls Natasha aside to reveal his latest newspaper creation, showing Rocky as an international crook, murderer and serial killer, whose M.O is to trap and seduce innocent girls like Natasha and then destroy their lives. Rocky overhears the conversation and while Natasha is occupied elsewhere, chases Sanju outside. Later, Rocky, Sanju and Tommy are seen sitting in a bar nearby after a confrontation, exposing each other as fraudsters and having a drink together, cursing their luck at the emergence of Karan as the new love in Natasha'a life.

The next day, Karan goes to Natasha's house to propose to her and finds that she has been sent an anonymous letter, informing her that he indeed had hired Rocky to follow her. In a spate of anger, she sends him out of the house. He goes to Rocky's house to confront him about this, and  finds Sanju and Tommy there as well. Meanwhile, Mehboob and his family, including Sunny, (his illegitimate son, who has also been obsessed with Tanya since college) arrive at Natasha's house and interrogate her about the stuffed toy. Realising that his father had used his obsession to track down Natasha, Sunny turns on his father and kidnaps her. Sweety informs Sanju about this and he along with Rocky, Karan and Tommy follow them after having gotten directions from Murugan, who happened to see them from a taxi. It is revealed that a code to a vault is what Mehboob was searching. The vault had carried a secret solution, two drops of which could decrease a person's age by 25 years.

Rocky intervenes and cleverly destroys the toy after having it speak the code into Natasha's ear. A gunfight ensues, during which Natasha discovers Tommy and Sanju's deceit. Baljeet kidnaps Natasha. Rocky and Sanju follow them on bikes and manage to catch up with them. After thrashing all the men, they take Natasha to her house where a further argument ensues as to who should be more worthy of Natasha. The argument ends when Karan arrives with Raj Sinha and tells Natasha about Sanju's newspaper scams, one of which had exposed Raj as a drug dealer and addict earlier. Raj and Natasha are reunited. Wishing them luck, Karan leaves.

Natasha realises her love for Karan and stops him as he is leaving, saying that she and Raj had had no future ever since their earlier break up. She then accepts and reciprocates his love and they finally unite. This tearful union is once again being witnessed by a grumbling Rocky, Sanju and Tommy along with Sunny.

At the end, the narrator says that after all the effort he had undertaken to acquire the solution, Mehboob had become too overexcited and had consumed the whole quantity instead of two drops. He had ended up becoming a baby and Sunny unwittingly became his father. The film ends as the narrator requests the audience not to forget him.

Cast 
Akshay Kumar as Ranbir "Rocky" Hiranandani 
Suniel Shetty as Sanjay "Sanju" Malwani 
Shahid Kapoor as Karan Sharma
Rimi Sen as Tanya Mulchandani / Natasha
Paresh Rawal as Tommy
Johnny Lever as Murugan
Vijay Raaz as Babloo
Om Puri as Scientist Khurana / Mehboob
Suresh Menon as Veerappan "Sunny" Khurana
Baljeet Singh as Baljeet Khurana
Supriya Pilgaonkar as Sweety Aunty
Asrani as the Blind Man
Leena as Kavita
Vivek Oberoi as Narrator 	
Aftab Shivdasani as Raj Sinha (special appearance)
Rakesh Bedi as Gullu Mulchandani
Snehal Dabi as Kutti Anna

Soundtrack

The music for all the songs were composed by Anu Malik and the lyrics for this film were by penned by Sameer.

References

External links

2005 films
2000s Hindi-language films
Films set in Dubai
Films directed by Vikram Bhatt
2005 romantic comedy films
Indian romantic comedy films
Films scored by Anu Malik
UTV Motion Pictures films
Films shot in Dubai
Films shot in the Emirate of Ras Al Khaimah
Indian action comedy-drama films
2000s action comedy films
Indian remakes of American films
Hindi films remade in other languages